Peter Patasi (born March 17, 1948) is a Canadian sprint canoer who competed in the mid-1970s. He was eliminated in the semifinals of the K-4 1000 m event at the 1976 Summer Olympics in Montreal.

References
Sports-Reference.com profile

1948 births
Canadian male canoeists
Canoeists at the 1976 Summer Olympics
Living people
Olympic canoeists of Canada
Place of birth missing (living people)
20th-century Canadian people